This is a list of megaprojects in the Seattle area. For this list, a megaproject follows the often cited definition of $1 billion (2017 dollars) or more.

Other Washington state megaprojects
Notable Washington state megaprojects outside the immediate Seattle area include the following:

Hanford cleanup $113.6 billion
Hanford Vitrification Plant $12 to $16.8 billion
WNP-3 and WNP-5 nuclear power plants up to $24 billion estimated to complete  (cancelled, WPPSS default)
Grand Coulee Dam $5.541 billion in 2017 dollars
Third Powerplant (completed 1980) $2.002 billion in 2017 dollars
North Spokane Corridor (freeway): $1.49 billion
Lower Snake River Wind Project phase I and II (Tucannon River Wind Farm) $1.33 billion 
Interstate 90 widening near Snoqualmie Pass: $1 billion

See also
List of megaprojects
List of tunnels in Seattle

References

Lists of most expensive things
Megaprojects
Megaprojects